The 2009 FIA GT Zolder 2 Hours is the eighth and final race of the 2009 FIA GT Championship season. It took place at Zolder, Belgium on 25 October 2009. It was also the final race held under the FIA GT Championship banner before the introduction of the FIA GT1 World Championship and FIA GT2 European Championship in 2010.

The race was won by the No. 33 Vitaphone Racing Team DHL Maserati of the Italians Alessandro Pier Guidi and Matteo Bobbi, leading the No. 4 Peka Racing Corvette and No. 1 Vitaphone Maserati. Michael Bartels and Andrea Bertolini secured the GT1 Drivers' Championship with their third-place finish. Richard Westbrook and Marco Holzer won the GT2 category in the No. 60 Prospeed Competition Porsche, with Westbrook securing the GT2 Drivers' Championship.

Report

Qualifying
Anthony Kumpen qualified the No. 4 Peka Racing Corvette on pole position ahead of the No. 1 Vitaphone Maserati. However the two cars on the front row were penalized for setting their fastest lap while a portion of the track was under yellow flag conditions. Both were moved back five grid spots, promoting the No. 33 Vitaphone Maserati to pole at the race start.

Qualifying results
Pole position winners in each class are marked in bold.

Race

Race results
Class winners in bold.  Cars failing to complete 75% of winner's distance marked as Not Classified (NC).

References

Zolder